ISO 31-2 is the part of international standard ISO 31 that defines names and symbols for quantities and units related to periodic and related phenomena.

Its definitions include:

Units of time
00031-2